Statistics of Austrian first league in the 1929–30 season.

Overview
It was contested by 11 teams, and SK Rapid Wien won the championship.

League standings

Results

References
Austria - List of final tables (RSSSF)

Austrian Football Bundesliga seasons
Austria
1929–30 in Austrian football